Herman Gregorius Gummerus (24 December 1877 in Saint Petersburg – 18 July 1948 in Helsinki) was a leading Finnish classical scholar, diplomat, and one of the founders of the Patriotic People's Movement (IKL).

Early life
Born in Saint Petersburg into a Swedish speaking family, Gummerus became an expert on the economy and society of Ancient Rome, and lectured at the University of Helsinki from 1911 to 1920 and again from 1926 to 1947. He initially studied in Helsinki, and then specialized in ancient history under the direction of Eduard Meyer in the University of Berlin.

Career

Academic
His studies on Rome were particularly concerned with rural life in the later period of the empire, a subject upon which he wrote widely. Gummerus' doctoral dissertation Der römische Gutsbetrieb als wirtschaftlicher Organismus nach den Werken des Cato, Varro und Columella (1906) examined large Roman estates using mainly literary sources. He further examined the economic system of the Roman empire in an article (Industrie und Handel, RE IX (1916), coll. 1381–1535) published in the Pauly–Wissowa classical encyclopedia, this time systematically using Archeological artifacts in his study. Gummerus' technique predated the work of Michael Rostovtzeff by a decade.

Political
An early advocate of Finnish independence, Gummerus was imprisoned for this in 1904, spending time in Peter and Paul Fortress. He went on to edit the journal Framtid and before forming the anti-Russification Wetterhof Bureau (later Finnish Bureau) in Germany in 1915.  After independence had been achieved Gummerus was appointed to posts in Stockholm and Kiev, where he had extended his anti-Russian activity and where he helped set up a legation during Ukraine's brief independence. He became Envoy to Rome in 1920 (a post he held until 1925) and developed an admiration for the growing fascist movement whilst in Italy.

On his return to Finland, and with the leaders of the Lapua Movement mostly imprisoned, he joined with Erkki Räikkönen, a fellow Swedish-speaker, and Vilho Annala to form IKL as a slightly more moderate continuation. Driven by an inherent conservatism, Gummerus desired an electoral alliance with the National Coalition Party but soon found that the rank and file of IKL had no interest in this.  IKL also adopted a strong position on the importance of the Finnish language, following the lead of the Academic Karelia Society and further isolating the Swedish-speaking Gummerus. He finally left the movement in 1934 and took no further role in active politics.

Despite his linguistic identity Gummerus went on to criticize Sweden, attacking the Blue Book of former Swedish foreign minister Johannes Hellner, which claimed that Sweden had only been interested in cultivating Finland as a good neighbour in the Åland crisis. Gummerus argued that, whilst this may have been the case, Swedish attitudes towards the newly independent country where such that a state of mistrust and suspicion was engendered between the two countries.

Bibliography 
 Der römische Gutsbetrieb (1905)
 Die Fonden der Kolonnen (1908)
 Aktiva kampår (1925)
 Jägare och aktivister (1927)

References

1877 births
1948 deaths
Swedish-speaking Finns
Patriotic People's Movement (Finland) politicians
Finnish diplomats
Finnish classical scholars
Historians of ancient Rome
Classical scholars of the University of Helsinki
Finnish fascists